A list of motorcycles produced under the Harley-Davidson brand.

Pre-war

Hummer/American Lightweight

Aermacchis sold as Harley-Davidsons
Aermacchi motorcycles sold in US with Harley-Davidson badging.

Touring

Small twins (Model W / 45 / K-series / Sportster)

FX/FXR/FXD/FLD/Dyna

Softail

Military

Trikes

See also
V-Rod Models

References

External links

Harley-Davidson
Motor vehicles manufactured in the United States
Harley